Attorney General Russell may refer to:

Charles Russell, Baron Russell of Killowen (1832–1900), Attorney General for England and Wales
Leslie W. Russell (1840–1903), Attorney General of New York

See also
General Russell (disambiguation)